Marcus Nash (born April 1, 1971) is an American cross-country skier. He competed at the 1994 Winter Olympics and the 1998 Winter Olympics.

References

External links
 

1971 births
Living people
American male cross-country skiers
Olympic cross-country skiers of the United States
Cross-country skiers at the 1994 Winter Olympics
Cross-country skiers at the 1998 Winter Olympics
Sportspeople from Bristol
20th-century American people